Margo Timmins (born January 27, 1961) is the lead vocalist of Canadian alternative country and folk rock band Cowboy Junkies. She is the sister of Michael Timmins, the band's lead guitarist, and Peter Timmins, the band's drummer. Her ethereal vocals, paired with the band's spare and low-key instrumentation played at a relaxed pace, lend the band its unique atmospheric sound.

Childhood
Margo Timmins was born and spent most of her childhood in Montreal as one of six children of Barbara and John Timmins. She describes her mother Barbara as "a very honest person, and very confident in who she was and her emotions and her place in the world. And I think if she gave anything, that's what she gave us: the sense that you do what you do, and not to worry about it too much. A confidence. Not a confidence that we're necessarily right, but even if we're wrong, well, too bad".

Her father, John Timmins, spent his professional life working in the sales and marketing divisions of several aviation companies. His passion in life, however, was music and his love of song was passed on to his children, especially his son Michael (Margo's brother) who would eventually form the band Cowboy Junkies.

As a young girl, she remembered going through her brother Michael's extensive record collection. Some of her early favourites that influence her to this day include: Highway 61 Revisited (1965), Blonde on Blonde (1966), and Nashville Skyline (1969),  by Bob Dylan, Nebraska (1982) by Bruce Springsteen, Harvest (1972) by Neil Young, and Townes Van Zandt's, Flyin' Shoes (1978).

In 1977, the Timmins family moved from Montreal to Toronto. They lived in Etobicoke in the west-end of the city and Margo attended Richview Collegiate Institute in her high school years.

Young adult
After graduating from high school, Timmins spent her evenings along with her brother Michael exploring the punk music scene in Toronto that was happening on Queen Street West. When Michael started his first band, the Hunger Project, she would hang out with the band, take the tickets, and carry the equipment.

Timmins supported herself by doing clerical work for her father and performing chores around the house.

But by her mid-20s, Timmins had left the night life behind and was studying social work at university.  It was also during this time that Timmins developed her signature mane of long hair.  As she tells it, "As a kid I was always mistaken for a boy. I didn't get long hair until my early 20s. That's when I discovered hair was important."

Cowboy Junkies

In 1985, her brother Michael recruited Margo as the lead vocalist for Cowboy Junkies even though she had never sung publicly before.  Initially Margo would not sing in front of the other band members, she would only sing in front of Michael.  Eventually, Michael convinced Margo to sing in front of the other band members and they liked her performance.

Margo Timmins has said about that time, "So when he asked me I was freaked out, but I said 'Okay, so long as if I don't do a good job you fire me' I didn't want to hurt his music, because his music is so important to him." It took a long time for her to get comfortable singing in front of an audience. In fact, many of the early shows had Margo singing with her back to the audience.

Timmins has stated that it took her ten years to get comfortable singing in front of an audience, and she suffers from stage fright.

Present

She lives in Toronto with her husband Graham Henderson and their son Ed. However, she likes to spend most of her time at their 100-year-old farmhouse in Grey County, Ontario.

She married Graham Henderson in 1988. She met her husband, an entertainment lawyer, in the mid-1980s after he heard the band's demo tapes and went to see them at Toronto's bar, restaurant and performance space The Rivoli. Shortly thereafter he was not only working to get the Junkies their recording contract with BMG in the U.S., but he and Margo started dating. Graham Henderson has been a partner at the law firm of McCarthy Tétrault and served as vice-president of business affairs and e-commerce at Universal Music Canada until 2000 when he was named president of the Canadian Recording Industry Association (CRIA).

While Timmins celebrated her 20th year of marriage she admitted to having a crush on Bruce Springsteen. She  said, "When I got married, I told my husband that if Bruce ever wanted me, that I would be his. And my husband said, OK".

She loves animals and she and Graham have had two Rhodesian Ridgeback dogs, Achilles and Drusilla, as well as Spartacus the cat. In 2002, Margo and Graham suffered a significant loss in the death of their dog Gaius. Graham described the loss this way, "On August 20, 2002 our dog Gaius was diagnosed with pneumonia. Margo and I had just finished a three week vacation. I left to come home for work on the Sunday evening. Margo noticed trouble almost right away. Though he was in hospital almost immediately, the disease ravaged him and his great, loving heart gave out in the early hours of August 25, 2002. For those of us without children, our animals often become our children".

It was after the death of this beloved pet, that Margo and Graham started exploring the possibility of adopting a child. The adoption process took a year, during the recording in 2004 of the Cowboy Junkies studio album One Soul Now. Margo and Graham eventually adopted Edward.

When Timmins is not on the road touring with Cowboy Junkies, she is home on the farm with her son Ed. Ed travels with the band on longer tours, but for shorter tours stays in Canada with his grandparents.

In 2009, she released a solo album of covers, Margo's Corner: Ty Tyrfu Sessions, Volume 1.

Honours
In 2016, she was made a member of the Order of Ontario.

Additional information
 Every square inch of her refrigerator door at her farm house is covered with a personal photo gallery of famous people she has met over the years, including Molly Ringwald, Sylvester Stallone, Meat Loaf, Bruce Springsteen, Jon Lovitz, Stephen Huff and Sean Penn.
 She sang "O Canada" at the 1994 Major League Baseball All-Star Game in Pittsburgh, while Meat Loaf sang "The Star-Spangled Banner" at the same game.

References

External links 
 

 
 
 

1961 births
20th-century Canadian women singers
21st-century Canadian women singers
Canadian women country singers
Canadian women pop singers
Canadian women rock singers
Living people
Members of the Order of Ontario
Musicians from Toronto
Singers from Montreal